This is a list of the Iraq national football team results from 1957 to 1969.

Results

1950s
1957

1959

1960s
1962

1964

1965

1966

1967

1968

1969

See also
Iraq national football team results

References

External links
Iraq fixtures on eloratings.net
Iraq on soccerway.com

1960s in Iraqi sport
1957
1950s in Iraq